Mark Kofi Sekyere  (born 28 December 1989 in Kumasi) is a Ghanaian footballer, playing for ASEC Mimosas.

Career
Sekyere a young defensive midfielder began his career by Feyenoord Academy, joined than on 12 June 2008 to Asante Kotoko, after a half year with Kumasi joined to ASEC Mimosas in January 2009. After three season with ASEC Mimosas returned to his home club Feyenoord Academy.

International career
On 4 December 2008 was nominated for the African Cup of Nations Qualifier 2009 for the Black Stars and played his debut on 19 November 2009 against Angola national football team.

References

External links
 

1989 births
Living people
Ghanaian footballers
Asante Kotoko S.C. players
Expatriate footballers in Ivory Coast
ASEC Mimosas players
West African Football Academy players
Footballers from Kumasi
Association football midfielders
Ghana international footballers
Ghanaian expatriate sportspeople in Ivory Coast